The 2001 United States Grand Prix (formally the 2001 SAP United States Grand Prix) was a Formula One motor race held on September 30, 2001, at Indianapolis Motor Speedway in Speedway, Indiana in the United States. The 73-lap race was the sixteenth and penultimate round of the 2001 Formula One season and was won by Mika Häkkinen. It was the first international sport/race event held in the United States after the September 11, 2001 attacks. Adding to the victory was the fact that the win also occurred two days after Häkkinen's 33rd birthday. It was Häkkinen's final victory and podium of his career. This was also the final live TV commentary for British veteran commentator Murray Walker.

Summary
Finland's Mika Häkkinen overcame some early race-day adversity and won the second United States Grand Prix at Indianapolis by 11 seconds over newly crowned World Champion and pole-sitter Michael Schumacher before a season-high crowd estimated at 175,000. "This Grand Prix is definitely one of my important victories," Häkkinen said. "Because I rate Monaco, Silverstone and Indianapolis, I think, as the Grands Prix a Grand Prix driver wants to win. It's something special. So this is something I'm never going to forget." It was the twentieth win of Häkkinen's career, and the last before fulfilling his stated plan to take a year off from racing, which wound up being retirement at the end of the season.

After a qualifying battle with Schumacher on Saturday and securing a front-row starting position, Häkkinen dug himself a hole on a cool but sunny race day: first, he slid off the track into the guardrail at the end of the infield straight in the morning warm-up, damaging his McLaren's suspension and requiring a heroic job by his crew to get the car ready to race. Three hours later, he learned that his failure to wait for the green light to begin the warm-up session had caused his best qualifying lap to be taken away, dropping him from second to fourth position on the grid.

At the start, Juan Pablo Montoya pulled his Williams from third spot around the outside of Michael Schumacher's Ferrari into Turn 1. Side by side through the initial right-hander, the two avoided contact by inches as Schumacher closed the door and seized the advantage into the left-handed Turn 2. It soon became clear, however, that the fastest car on the track was the Ferrari of Rubens Barrichello, ostensibly carrying a light fuel load and on a two-stop strategy. The Brazilian took second from Montoya beginning Lap 3, then passed Schumacher two laps later for the lead.

While Barrichello was making his way to the front, three of the field's youngest drivers, Sauber
teammates Nick Heidfeld and Kimi Räikkönen, along with Jordan's Jarno Trulli, entered the braking zone for Turn 1 three-wide on the second lap. Räikkönen became the meat in the sandwich and had his front wing broken by contact with Trulli. He retired immediately after pitting for repairs, while Heidfeld and Trulli were undamaged and both eventually ended up in the points.

Once in the lead, Barrichello quickly opened up a considerable gap back to Schumacher, and by his first pit stop on Lap 27, he led by 12.5 seconds. He returned from the pits in fifth place, behind the two McLarens, as Schumacher returned to the lead. Montoya, meanwhile, was flying as his Michelin tires began to gain traction and provide him an advantage. On Lap 34, just a lap after nearly losing control in Turn 4, Montoya took the lead by outbraking Schumacher down the inside of Turn 1 as they approached the Minardi of Alex Yoong. "I was trying to get close enough coming into the straight," Montoya said later, "and that time I knew I was going to get close enough because of traffic. I just went for it." Michael Schumacher said later, "I don't know where he came from." Almost immediately, Montoya built a 2.3-second advantage, recording the fastest lap of the race before pitting on Lap 36 and returning in fifth. Once again, Schumacher led, this time from Häkkinen, with neither car having visited the pits.

Just two laps later, immediately after Ralf Schumacher had spun and stalled his Williams in Turn 6, the crowd on the front straight groaned as Montoya moved over to the pit wall and rolled to a stop. "It (the Williams) was really good," Montoya said a few minutes later, at the back of his garage. "The car was really competitive. I wanted to really go for the win here, and it's a big disappointment we couldn't finish the race. I think the engine was running really strong. I don't know, I think it was a hydraulic (problem) because I lost all the gears and everything. When I stopped, the engine was still running."

When Schumacher stopped on Lap 39, the McLarens were briefly first and second ahead of Barrichello.
David Coulthard surrendered second place by pitting on Lap 42 and returned in fourth, while Häkkinen took control of the race by staying out until Lap 46. At Häkkinen's stop, Barrichello led again until his second stop on Lap 50, when Häkkinen took the lead for good, having won the strategy battle with the World Champions.

As Barrichello returned from his second stop in second place, he seemed to be the only one with a
chance to challenge Häkkinen. Both Williams were gone, and the teammates of the two front-runners were showing no signs of mounting an attack, but it seemed the Brazilian might indeed have the speed to chase down the Finn's McLaren. The gap dropped steadily, down to 2.2 seconds on Lap 61, until smoke started to appear intermittently at the back of Barrichello's car. The engine note on the long front straight each time by made it clear that the usually reliable Ferrari was on its last legs. On Lap 71, with Coulthard closing in, Schumacher could hope no longer that his teammate would limp home in second. The German took second from Barrichello, and on the next lap, Coulthard took third, just a few turns before the Ferrari's engine failed and spun on the infield straight.

It was a disappointing end for Barrichello, whose chance for second place in the Driver's Championship slipped further away, but a tremendously popular and rewarding win for Mika Häkkinen. Having endured a frustrating and unproductive season, not a Championship contender for the first time in four years, and one race away from a voluntary "sabbatical" from racing, Häkkinen basked in the crowd's glow, for what would prove to be the last time.

Jarno Trulli's three points for fourth place moved Jordan ahead of fellow Honda-powered BAR in the Constructor's Championship, a result that endured after the final race in Japan. Eddie Irvine finished fifth, his first time in the points since making the podium in Monaco, and Nick Heidfeld's sixth place was a fitting reward for a fine weekend.

Classification

Qualifying

Notes

 – Mika Häkkinen's best qualifying time was actually 1:11.945 but it was deleted due to Häkkinen ignoring a red light during the final practice session. This demoted him from 2nd to 4th on the grid.

Race

Notes

 At the start of the race, Tomáš Enge did not get away and stalled on the dummy grid.
 Since the race was less than three weeks after the September 11, 2001 attacks, members of some teams took alternate air routes from Europe (through Philadelphia or Chicago), apparently for safety reasons.

 Also in response to the terrorist attacks, many of the teams and drivers had special US tributes on their cars and helmets. The Schumacher brothers both wore a special helmet design that prominently featured the American flag. Jordan's Jarno Trulli added to the standard American flag theme with the words, "Peace no war." The Jordan cars also had American flags prominently displayed on the engine cover (see photo) at the request of team sponsor Deutsche Post. The Jaguar team also displayed an American flag on their engine cover, and Benetton had a similar flag placed near its sidepod.
 Prior to the race, John Mellencamp performed his song "Peaceful World," since the race was less than 3 weeks after September 11.
 In the race, Jean Alesi's Jordan carried the number "200" on its sidepods, commemorating his 200th (and penultimate) Grand Prix.
 Several hours after the race, Jarno Trulli had his fourth-place result taken away for having too much wear on the plank under his Jordan, but the team's appeal of the decision was accepted four weeks later and the result was reinstated.

Championship standings after the race 
Bold text indicates the World Champions.

Drivers' Championship standings

Constructors' Championship standings

Note: Only the top five positions are included for both sets of standings.

References

United States Grand Prix
United States Grand Prix
United States Grand Prix, 2001
2001 in sports in Indiana
United States Grand Prix
Grand Prix